Vaill is a surname. Notable people with the surname include:

Amanda Vaill, American writer and editor
Peter Vaill, American academic
Teresa Vaill (born 1962), American racewalker

See also
Dudley Vaill Talcott (1899–1896), American sculptor, author and illustrator
Edward W. Vaill House, historic house in New Jersey, United States
Vaill., taxonomic author abbreviation of Sébastien Vaillant (1669–1722), French botanist